Saint-Denis-d'Authou is a former commune in the Eure-et-Loir department in northern France. On 1 January 2019, it was merged into the new commune Saintigny.

Population

See also
Communes of the Eure-et-Loir department

References

Former communes of Eure-et-Loir